Farida is an Arabic feminine given name, meaning unique. In Urdu it is spelled and pronounced the same way as Arabic. In Turkish it is spelled as Feride. In Persian, the name is rendered as Farideh in the Iranian dialect, but Farida (Фарида) in the Afghan and Tajik dialects. It is one of the common female names throughout the Muslim world.

People
 Farida was a 9th-century Arabic musician and wife of al-Mutawakkīl.
 Farida of Egypt (1921–1988), Queen of Egypt
 Farida Azam (1937–1992), Pakistani politician's wife
 Farida Azizi, Afghan women's rights activist
 Farida Belghoul (born 1958), French-Algerian author
 Farida Diouri (1953–2004), Moroccan novelist
 Farida Haddouche (born 1959), Algerian politician
 Maria Farida Indrati, referred to as Farida (born 1949), Indonesian judge
 Farida Jalal (born 1949), Indian actress
 Farida Kant, Italian drag queen
 Farida Karodia (born 1942), South African novelist and short-story writer
 Farida Khanum (born 1935), Pakistani Ghazal singer from Punjab
 Farida Mammadova (born 1936), Azerbaijani historian
 Farida Mohammad Ali (born 1963), Iraqi singer
 Farida Nekzad, Afghan journalist
 Farida Osman (born 1995), Egyptian-American swimmer
 Farida Parveen (born 1954), Bangladeshi singer
 Farida Waller (born 1993), Thai actress and model
 Farida Waziri (born 1946), Nigerian technocrat, law enforcement officer
 Feride Hilal Akın (born 1996), Turkish singer
 Farideh Heyat (born 1949), British-Iranian anthropologist 
 Farideh Lashai (1944-2013), Iranian painter
 Farideh Moradkhani, Iranian engineer, human rights activist

Notes

See also
  for articles on persons with this first name

Arabic feminine given names
Bosnian feminine given names
Pakistani feminine given names